Koert van Mensvoort (born 9 April 1974) is an artist, philosopher and scientist best known for his work on the philosophical concept of Next Nature.

Academic 
Van Mensvoort is the head of the Next Nature Lab at the Industrial Design Department of the Eindhoven University of Technology, a position he has held since 2003.
In 1997 Van Mensvoort received a Master of Science degree in computer science, specializing in computer graphics from the Eindhoven University of Technology. In 2000 he completed a Master of Fine Arts degree at the Sandberg Institute in Amsterdam. In 2008 he was Visionary in Residence at Art Center College of Design in Pasadena. Van Mensvoort received a doctorate from the Eindhoven University of Technology in 2009 for his thesis What You See Is What You Feel. Van Mensvoort is the founder and director of the Next Nature Network, a design-and-think tank based in Amsterdam, The Netherlands.

Projects 
Van Mensvoort works in many different media to materialize his philosophy. Most of his multi-media projects are concerned with how technology becomes so omnipresent, intricate and uncontrollable we start to perceive it as a nature of its own. Notable projects

 The book Next Nature: Nature Changes Along With Us with Hendrik-Jan Grievink. Scientific American magazine wrote in a review that “next nature can give us a new vocabulary and a new philosophy to see and design the world.”
 The Rise and Fall of Rayfish Footwear online film project on the fictional company Rayfish.com that offered personalized sneakers crafted from genetically modified stingray leather.
 The NANO Supermarket a mobile exhibition featuring nanotech products that might be on the market within the next ten years.
 The Datafountain, is an internet-enabled water fountain connected to money currency rates.
 The documentary Daddy! The Woods Smell of Shampoo, exploring the intimate role media play in our society: how the media have become fundamentally part of the cycle through which we create meaning and it effectively becomes impossible to distinguish media from reality.
 The Fake for Real memory game on the tension between reality and simulation.
 The online interactive dance film Drift, featuring a dancer without a body but kinetic points in space, dance and choreography by Nancy Mauro-Flude.
 The Biggest Visual Power Show, a pop conference held in Amsterdam, Zollverein and Los Angeles.

Books 
Van Mensvoort has co-authored numerous books and publications.
 Next Nature: Nature Changes Along With Us, edited and designed by Koert van Mensvoort and Hendrik-Jan Grievink. The book examines people’s notion of nature and how the image of nature as static, balanced and harmonic is naive and up for reconsideration. Where technology and nature are traditionally seen as opposed, they now appear to merge or even trade places.
 Visual Power
 What You See Is What You Feel
 Natuur 2.0
 Entry Paradise – New Worlds of Design
 Artvertising
 Style First

Lectures and speeches 
 Next Nature: How Technology becomes Nature, SXSW 2015, Austin, Texas, 2015
 Designer Organisms, Biofabricate 2014, Microsoft Technology Center, New York, USA, 2014
 What if.., Thailand Creative Design Center, Bangkok, Thailand, 2014
 ASML Techtalk, ASML, Veldhoven, The Netherlands, 2013
 Eindhoven University Lecture 2013, Eindhoven, The Netherlands, 2013
 Next Nature, TEDx Danubia, Budapest, Hungary, 2013
 DesignMarch, Iceland Design Festival, Reykjavik, Iceland, 2012
 Next Ecology, Amber Festival, Istanbul, Turkey, 2011
 Real Nature is Not Green, Wilderness Festival, Oxfordshire, UK, 2011
 Nano Supermarket, TEDx, Eindhoven, 2011
 HAIP New Nature, Ljubiana, Slovenia, 2010
 Work, Demo Symposium, Lille, France, 2010
 Money as a Medium, Follow the Money Conference, De Balie, Amsterdam, 2010
 Nature Transformer – Microwave Festival, Hong Kong, China, 2009
 Paralelo Lecture, Museum of Image and Sound, São Paulo, Brazil, 2009
 Software Studies, UCSD Center for Research in Computing and the Arts, San Diego, 2008
 Lecture Real Nature is not Green, Farmlab, Los Angeles, 2008
 Discovery07, Science Festival, Amsterdam, 2007
 Media Department, University of Xiamen, China, 2007
 Next Nature, STRP Festival Art & Technology, Eindhoven, 2006
 Wat je ziet bestaat niet!, Communication Museum, the Hague, 2004
 White Lady Lecture, Design Academy, Eindhoven, 2003
 Lecture, Empathy and Machines, Zaplab, Eindhoven, 2002
 Perceptions in Illusion, the Day of Design 2001, Eindhoven, 2001

References

External links 

 

1974 births
Living people
21st-century Dutch philosophers
Postmodernists
Critical theorists
Eindhoven University of Technology alumni
Academic staff of the Eindhoven University of Technology
People from Veldhoven